Megalechis thoracata (black marble hoplo, spotted hoplo) is a species of catfish of the family Callichthyidae.  M. thoracata is found east of the Andes in the Amazon, Orinoco, and upper Paraguay River basins, as well as in the coastal rivers of the Guianas and northern Brazil. Recent introductions were recorded in the upper Paraná River drainage.

Care in captivity 
Overview: The Spotted Hoplo Catfish is an incredibly hardy and relatively easy species to keep in captivity, with the main difficulty being the maximum size of around 6 inches, or 15 cm.They are a very peaceful fish, with the only exception being when the males are guarding a bubble nest at breeding time. They can be kept with almost all tankmates, but they will likely eat anything that can fit in their mouths. This rule also applies for larger fish, as the Hoplo may get eaten or have its barbels or fins damaged by large, potentially aggressive fish, such as South American Cichlids, African Cichlids, larger catfish and basically anything that can fit the Hoplo in its mouth or shows aggression.

Tank Setup: They need a soft sand substrate, as they are bottom dwellers that spend lots of time digging around for food. The soft sand is essential, as other coarse grained or abrasive substrates can irritate the fish's sensitive barbels, and even cause them to fall off. To thrive in the aquarium, they need a minimum tank size of 55 US liquid gallons, but as a rule of thumb for this fish, the larger the tank, the better. They also like to live in groups of at least five, but still do fine alone or in pairs. Hoplo Catfish need hiding places, usually in the form of rocks, wood and platns, such as variations of Anubias, valisineria, java fern and micranthemum. Floating plants are also appreciated, as they provide extra cover.

Water Conditions: Despite the Hoplo being a very hardy fish, like all fish they need a mature, cycled tank with the correct parameters for almost all hardy tropical fish. As they are a tropical fish, the optimal temperature for them is around 24-28 degrees Celsius, but they can adapt to temperatures in the 22-30 degrees Celsius range, which is not recommended.

Habitat 
The natural habitat of Megalechis thoracata is slow flowing, low oxygen parts of the  Amazon, Orinoco, and upper Paraguay River basins. For this reason, catfish of the family Callichthyidae among other fish, have developed a unique way of breathing, where the fish will take a gulp of air at the surface of the water. The oxygen will then be absorbed through the lining of the stomach and intestine. This is known as gastrointestinal respiration. They will feed on small to medium-sized worms and other invertebrates, small fish, and general detritus.

Ecology
M. thoracata has been observed to produce sounds during territorial behavior in males at their nest sites and especially during spawning, and during aggressive behavior in both sexes. M. thoracata males aggressively defend territories against intruders.

References 
 

thoracata
Fish of Bolivia
Freshwater fish of Brazil
Freshwater fish of Colombia
Freshwater fish of Ecuador
Freshwater fish of Peru
Fish of the Amazon basin
Taxa named by Achille Valenciennes
Fish described in 1840